Bonon (also known as Brozra) is a city in west-central Ivory Coast. It is a sub-prefecture and commune of Bouaflé Department in Marahoué Region, Sassandra-Marahoué District.

In 2021, the population of the sub-prefecture of Bonon was 116,871.

Villages
The 7 villages of the sub-prefecture of Bonon and their population in 2014 are:
 Blablata (795)
 Bognonzra (11 789)
 Bonon (92 523)
 Dabouzra (829)
 Gobazra (3 978)
 Madieta (788)
 Ouarébota (1 927)

Notes

Sub-prefectures of Marahoué
Communes of Marahoué